Lethal VR is a virtual reality shooting gallery video game developed by Three Fields Entertainment and published by Team17.

Gameplay
Lethal VR is a virtual reality shooting gallery video game played from a first-person perspective. Players assume the role of FBI recruit who is being assessed in a target range.

Development and release
Lethal VR was developed by UK-based video game studio Three Fields Entertainment. It is the second game from the studio following their debut title Dangerous Golf. Lethal VR was built in the Unreal Engine 4 game engine and specifically for the HTC Vive and PlayStation VR virtual reality headsets. The development team paused work on their upcoming game (Danger Zone) and began working on Lethal VR in mid 2016 after Epic Games sent them several Vive kits.

Lethal VR was published by Team17. The game was released for Windows on 8 November 2016 and PlayStation 4 on 20 December 2016.

Reception

Lethal VR received "mixed or average reviews" from professional critics according to review aggregator website Metacritic.

References

External links
 

2016 video games
First-person shooters
HTC Vive games
PlayStation 4 games
PlayStation VR games
Single-player video games
Unreal Engine games
Video games about police officers
Video games developed in the United Kingdom
Virtual reality games
Windows games
Team17 games
Three Fields Entertainment games